Satdhara is an archaeological site, consisting of stupas and viharas, located  west of Sanchi, Madhya Pradesh, India.

There are four groups of stupas surrounding Sanchi, within a radius of twenty kilometers: Bhojpur and Andher in the southeast, Sonari to the southwest, and Satdhara to the west. Further south, about 100 km away, is Saru Maru.

All these stupas were found by Major Cunningham, who took the relics found in the center of the stupas to England. He donated them to the British Museum and the Victoria and Albert Museum.

Gallery

References

External links 
 Photodharma images of Satdhara
 Reliquary of Stupa No. 7 (British Museum)
 Reliquary of Stupa No. 7 (British Museum)
 Reliquary of Stupa No. 8 (British Museum)

Stupas in India